Volition may refer to:

 Volition (psychology), the process of making and acting on decisions
 Coherent Extrapolated Volition, hypothetical choices and the actions collectively taken with more knowledge and ability
 Volition (linguistics), a distinction to express whether the subject intended the action or not
 Volition (company), a video game developer known for the Saints Row and Red Faction series
 Volition Records, a record label
 Volition (Protest the Hero album), 2013
 Volition (As Hell Retreats album), 2011
 Volition (film), 2019 science fiction film